Nizhnetroitsky is a rural locality (a selo) and the administrative centre of Nizhnetroitsky Selsoviet, Tuymazinsky District, Bashkortostan, Russia. The population was 4,008 as of 2010. There are 12 streets.

Geography 
Nizhnetroitsky is located 38 km south of Tuymazy (the district's administrative centre) by road. Verkhnetroitskoye is the nearest rural locality.

References 

Rural localities in Tuymazinsky District